Spadafora is a surname. Notable people with the surname include:

David Spadafora, American historian
Domenico Spadafora (1450–1521), Italian Roman Catholic priest
Hugo Spadafora (1940–1985), Italian-Panamanian physician and guerrilla fighter
Paul Spadafora (born 1975), American boxer
Ronald Spadafora (1954–2018), American firefighter